Bangladesh University (BU) is a non-profit, private university. Its main campus is located near the Jatiyo Sangshad Bhaban in Dhaka, Bangladesh. The university was established in 2001 under the Private University Act 1992. The university's founder was Quazi Azher Ali, who served as first vice chancellor of the university from 2001 to 2009.

Faculties and departments
Bangladesh University has the following faculties and departments:
Faculty of Business Administration & Economics
 Dept. of Business Administration
 Dept. of Economics

Faculty of Science, Engineering and Technology
 Dept. of Computer Science and Engineering (CSE)
 Dept. of Architecture
 Dept. of Electrical and Electronic Engineering (EEE)
Mathematics
Pharmacy

Faculty of Arts, Social Science & Law
 Dept. of English
 Dept. of Law
 Dept. of Sociology

Clubs
BUPC (Bangladesh University Pharmacy Club)
BUEC (Bangladesh University Economics Club)
BUDS (Bangladesh University Debating Society)
IEEE (Institute of Electrical and Electronics Engineers)

Academic calendar
The academic system of BU consists with three semesters:
 Spring semester
 Summer semester
 Fall semester

The academic system of BU for Engineering consists with two semesters:
 Spring semester
 Fall semester

List of vice-chancellors 
 Prof. Anwarul Haque Sharif 
 Prof. Dr. Mesbah Uddin Ahmed (Mesbah Kamal), Present VC

References

External links
 Bangladesh University

Educational institutions established in 2001
Private universities in Bangladesh
2001 establishments in Bangladesh
Universities and colleges in Dhaka